Kawaan LaAndrae Baker (born August 24, 1998) is an American football wide receiver for the New Orleans Saints of the National Football League (NFL). He played college football at South Alabama and was drafted by the Saints in the seventh round of the 2021 NFL Draft.

Early life
Baker was born on August 24, 1998, in East Point, Georgia to Larry and Crystal Upshaw.

Professional career

New Orleans Saints
Baker was drafted by the New Orleans Saints in the seventh round, 255th overall, of the 2021 NFL Draft. He signed his four-year rookie contract with New Orleans on June 8, 2021. He was waived on August 31, 2021 and re-signed to the practice squad. He signed a reserve/future contract with the Saints on January 11, 2022.

On August 2, 2022, Baker was suspended for the first six games of the regular season. He was waived on October 17.

Green Bay Packers
On October 19, 2022, Baker was signed to the Green Bay Packers' practice squad. He was released on November 8.

Philadelphia Eagles
On November 30, 2022, Baker was signed to the Philadelphia Eagles practice squad. He was released on December 6.

New Orleans Saints (second stint)
On December 27, 2022, Baker was signed to the New Orleans Saints practice squad. He signed a reserve/future contract on January 26, 2023.

References

External links
Green Bay Packers bio
South Alabama Jaguars bio

Living people
New Orleans Saints players
1998 births
Players of American football from Atlanta
South Alabama Jaguars football players
American football wide receivers
Green Bay Packers players
Philadelphia Eagles players